Sugar Creek Township, Indiana may refer to one of the following places:

 Sugar Creek Township, Boone County, Indiana
 Sugar Creek Township, Clinton County, Indiana
 Sugar Creek Township, Hancock County, Indiana
 Sugar Creek Township, Montgomery County, Indiana
 Sugar Creek Township, Parke County, Indiana
 Sugar Creek Township, Shelby County, Indiana
 Sugar Creek Township, Vigo County, Indiana

See also
Sugar Creek, Indiana, an unincorporated community in Shelby County
Sugar Creek Township (disambiguation)

Indiana township disambiguation pages